Robert 'Bobby' Donnelly (born 12 September 1962) is a South African lawn bowler.

Bowls career
Donnelly secured a silver medal in the fours at the 2000 World Outdoor Bowls Championship before competing in the 2002 Commonwealth Games bowls singles after receiving a late call up as an injury replacement. He took a surprise gold medal defeating Jeremy Henry in the final.

In 2009 he won the triples and fours gold medals at the Atlantic Bowls Championships and two years later he won the pairs gold medal and singles bronze medal at the 2011 Atlantic Bowls Championships.

He won the 2013 singles at the National Championships bowling for the Wanderers Bowls Club.

A second Commonwealth Games gold came his way in the men's triples at the 2014 Commonwealth Games.

He was selected as part of the South Africa team for the 2018 Commonwealth Games on the Gold Coast in Queensland.

References

1962 births
Living people
People from Boksburg
Bowls players at the 2002 Commonwealth Games
Bowls players at the 2010 Commonwealth Games
Bowls players at the 2014 Commonwealth Games
Commonwealth Games gold medallists for South Africa
South African male bowls players
Commonwealth Games medallists in lawn bowls
Sportspeople from Gauteng
Medallists at the 2002 Commonwealth Games
Medallists at the 2014 Commonwealth Games